Avernus Colles is a region of fractured terrain on Mars on the southeast margin of Elysium Planitia, at 1.6°S, 171°E. It is fairly large, being 244 km (152 mi) in diameter. Avernus Colles can be found in the Elysium quadrangle.  It was named in 1985 after a lake in Campania, Italy, which is believed by some to be an entrance to the underworld.

References

Surface features of Mars
Aeolis quadrangle